WCEN-FM (94.5 MHz, "The Moose") is a radio station broadcasting a country music format. WCEN has been licensed in Hemlock, Michigan since 2001. It first began broadcasting in 1959 and was originally licensed in Mount Pleasant, Michigan (though the tower location and signal pattern have not changed since the city of license change, and the station still has a local-grade signal in Mount Pleasant). The station has been playing country music since 1969 and as a full-time format since 1980.

Early history and AM frequency
On October 16, 1948, Paul A. Brandt, a Mount Pleasant, Mich., businessman, applied to the Federal Communications Commission for a broadcast station construction permit. On April 21, 1948, the FCC granted a construction permit for station WCEN and building began. On August 8, 1949, WCEN-AM went on the air for the first time as a 500-watt, AM daytime only station on 1150 kHz. The studios were located in downtown Mount Pleasant at 112½ E. Broadway, above Voisin's Jewelry store. The transmitter was located about one mile south of the then city limits, just east of U.S. 27 on Bluegrass Road. In late 1949, Steve Cole became the chief engineer and general manager. On December 17, 1951, the FCC granted a construction permit for WCEN improvements. On February 26, 1952, the station began full-time operation on 1150 kHz with 1,000 watts, non-directional daytime, and 500 watts directional nighttime power. In late 1953, the WCEN studios were moved from downtown Mount Pleasant to the Bluegrass Road transmitter site. In 1959, WCEN-FM went on the air at 94.5 MHz. The FM transmitter and antenna were co-located at the Bluegrass Road location. In 1969, a country format was tried for the first time on the 94.5 frequency; and later a dayparted mixture of country and rock. Afterwards, 94.5 turned into a full-time country station as "94 Country". This came with an upgrade in 1990 which moved both the AM and FM transmitters to a location near Coleman, Michigan. The new thousand-foot FM tower and erp of 100,000 watts for WCEN provided the maximum Class C1 coverage area, reaching much of Mid-Michigan including the Tri-Cities. Later the entire Tri-Cities station group was sold to Wilks Broadcasting for $6 million. In November 2000, WCEN-AM at 1150 went silent after 51 years serving the Mount Pleasant area.

Listening area & range 
WCEN has a relatively strong signal with the ability to reach the Mid-Michigan Thumb. During certain atmospheric conditions, it has the tendency to reach the Far northern Oakland County area, however the signal is not often strong that far south.
WCEN can also be heard in western Sanilac County and under the right conditions, as far east as Marlette. WCEN has a large coverage area, giving local coverage to about thirteen counties.

Airstaff 
The current lineup (as of June 2015) is as follows 
The Moose Morning Show with Jim Biggins and Jodi K. (5:30am to 9:30am)
Lunch / Afternoon Gerry Clark (9am to 2pm)
Afternoon Drive / Evenings Joby Phillips (2pm to 7pm)
Evenings / Late Nights The Big Time With Whitney Allan (7pm to 12am)
Overnights
Weekends / Fill-ins

External links

WCEN History page

CEN-FM
Country radio stations in the United States
Radio stations established in 1959
Alpha Media radio stations